Grabowe Pole  is a village in the administrative district of Gmina Suchy Dąb, within Gdańsk County, Pomeranian Voivodeship, in northern Poland.

The village has a population of 220.

See also
History of Pomerania, for details of the history of the region.

References

Grabowe Pole